Nicholas Gilbert (born 1963) is a former English cricketer.

Nicholas Gilbert or Nicolas Gilbert may also refer to:
Nicolas Gilbert (born 1979), Canadian composer
Nicolas Joseph Laurent Gilbert (1750–1780), French poet
Nick Gilbert (born 1965), Canadian soccer player
Nick Gilbert, original guitarist for the band Felt